Glipa subsinuata is a species of beetle in the genus Glipa. It was described in 1917.

References

subsinuata
Beetles described in 1917